Li Sheng may refer to:

 Li Sheng (Three Kingdoms)  (李勝: ? - 249), Cao Wei official
 Li Sheng (Tang dynasty) (李晟: 727-793), Tang dynasty general
 Li Sheng (artist)  (fl. 1346), Chinese landscape artist
 Li Sheng (computer scientist) (李生; born 1943)